Mary Chilton (May 31, 1607 – May 16,1679) was a Pilgrim and purportedly the first European woman to step ashore at Plymouth, Massachusetts.

Biography

Mary Chilton was baptized on May 31, 1607 in Sandwich, Kent, England and was the daughter of the Mayflower passenger, James Chilton.  Mary Chilton's mother's name has been listed as "Susannah, possibly Furner" in many places. She is listed by William Bradford as "Mrs. Chilton" or "James Chilton's wife." He may have never known her given name.  At the age of thirteen, Mary Chilton accompanied her parents on the voyage to Plymouth. Her father, age sixty-four, was the oldest passenger on the Mayflower.

Her father died on December 18, 1620, while the Mayflower was anchored in Provincetown Harbor, and her mother died six weeks later on January 21, 1621, shortly after arriving at Plymouth. Both died of "the first infection of the disease" reported by Governor William Bradford in 1650. Once orphaned, she may have become the ward of Myles Standish or John Alden. Chilton was given three shares in the land division of 1623, one for herself and one each for her deceased parents. Her property was situated between those of Standish and John Howland.

She was one of eleven minor girls on the Mayflower, nine of whom survived the first year at Plymouth Rock and would have been present at the time of the famous First Thanksgiving in 1621. In contrast, only four of the 14 adult women survived the first year.

She married John Winslow (possibly on October 12, 1624) and thus became the sister-in-law of Mayflower passenger Edward Winslow.  They had ten children: John, Susannah, Mary, Edward, Sarah, Samuel, Joseph, Isaac, an unnamed child who probably died in infancy, and Benjamin. All but Benjamin married, and Benjamin's birth is the only one listed in the records of Plymouth colony.

The family moved to Boston some time after the birth of Benjamin in 1653. There John Winslow is said to have prospered as a merchant.

She made out a will on July 31, 1676 (one of two female passengers from the Mayflower who did so, Elizabeth Tilley being the other) and died before May 1, 1679 in Boston.

Legend
By legend, Chilton was the first passenger to step ashore at Plymouth, seemingly so excited that she jumped out of the small boat and waded ashore onto "Plymouth Rock." 

The Chilton Club, a private social club in Boston, MA, was named in her honor.

Notable descendants
Notable descendants of Mary Chilton include: 

 Edward Winslow, silversmith and military leader
 Nicholas Gilman, signer of the U.S. Constitution
 Lucretia Garfield, First Lady of the United States 
 George H. W. Bush and George W. Bush, Presidents of the United States
 Robert Warren Miller, businessman, and his daughters Pia Getty, Marie-Chantal, Crown Princess of Greece, and Alexandra von Fürstenberg
 Howard Dean, Governor of Vermont and presidential candidate
 John F. MacArthur, American Pastor and author

References

External links
  Last Will of Mary Chilton

1607 births
1679 deaths
Mayflower passengers
People from Sandwich, Kent
Burials in Boston
Kingdom of England emigrants to Massachusetts Bay Colony